Capel railway station was a station in Capel St Mary, Suffolk, on a short branch line from Bentley Junction to Hadleigh. The station buildings were remarkably ornate for a village with a population of 649 in 1851 and 504 in 1931. There were goods sidings on the northern side of the station, which were used extensively in World War II handling supplies to a nearby United States Army Air Forces base, later known as RAF Raydon.

The line opened in 1847 and closed to passenger traffic in 1932 and for freight services in 1964 a year before closure of the line. As the railway line through the station crossed the A12 road at a level-crossing, when the road was widened in the early 1970s the station was demolished. Capel Station Garage and car repairs workshop now occupies part of the site.

References

External links
 Capel station on navigable 1946 O. S. map
 The Story of Hadleigh's railway

Disused railway stations in Suffolk
Former Great Eastern Railway stations
Railway stations in Great Britain opened in 1847
Railway stations in Great Britain closed in 1932
1847 establishments in England
Babergh District